Fosco Giachetti (28 March 1900, in Sesto Fiorentino – 22 December 1974, in Rome) was an Italian actor.

Fosco Giachetti was the protagonist of  Lo squadrone bianco (1936), directed by Augusto Genina.  He became the leading man in Fascist propaganda films such as Tredici uomini e un cannone (1936), Sentinelle di bronzo (1937), Scipione l'Africano, Edgar Neville's Italian Carmen fra i rossi (1939), L'assedio dell'Alcazar (1940) and Bengasi (1942).  In 1942, he also co-starred in Goffredo Alessandrini's two part Noi Vivi and Addio Kira!.

Un colpo di pistola (1942) by Renato Castellani and Fari nella nebbia (1942) by Gianni Franciolini were not as successful as his earlier films.

After the war, he returned to the stage. He worked in Spain with Edgar Neville in Nada and in Carne de horca. He had a supporting role in 1959 Dino Risi's successful comedy Il mattatore.  In 1964, he appeared in an adaptation of A. J. Cronin's novel, The Citadel.

In 2003, the Galleria Fosco Giachetti in Sesto Fiorentino was opened in his honor.

Filmography

Awards
 Venice Film Festival Best Actor for Bengasi, 1942

External links
 

1900 births
1974 deaths
People from Sesto Fiorentino
Italian male stage actors
Italian male film actors
Volpi Cup for Best Actor winners
20th-century Italian male actors